Seven Seeds (Spanish: Sietes semillas) is a 2016 Peruvian comedy-drama film directed by Daniel Rodríguez Risco and written by Daniel & Gonzalo Rodríguez Risco. It is based on the book El secreto de las 7 semillas by David Fischman. It stars Carlos Alcántara. It premiered on October 20, 2016 in Peruvian theaters.

Synopsis 
Ignacio Rodríguez, a businessman, is admitted to the hospital due to a business and personal crisis. There he meets Lucho, his brother, who recommends him to visit a spiritual guide. Despite his disbelief, Ignacio decides to go see him and thus begins a journey of learning that leads him to find the inner peace he needed, and to revalue and recover the most valuable thing he has: his family.

Cast 
The actors participating in this film are:

 Carlos Alcántara as Ignacio Rodríguez
 Marco Zunino as Lucho
 Javier Cámara as Master
 Federico Luppi as Manuel
 Gianella Neyra as Miriam
 Ramón García as Castillo
 Jely Reategui as Carmen
 Katerina D'Onofrio as Cecilia
 Bernie Paz as Sergio
 Brando Gallesi as David

Production 
Principal photography began on April 11, 2016.

Reception 
Seven Seeds was seen by 28,445 viewers on its opening day in theaters. At the end of its first weekend it was seen by 253,463 viewers. It exceeded 530,000 viewers in its third weekend. In order of the year, the film attracted 611,256 viewers, becoming the fifth highest-grossing Peruvian film of 2016.

References

External links 
 

2016 films
2016 comedy-drama films
Peruvian comedy-drama films
Tondero Producciones films
2010s Spanish-language films
2010s Peruvian films
Films set in Peru
Films shot in Peru
Films about families
Films based on books